The Northern India cricket team was an Indian domestic cricket team that competed in the Ranji Trophy between 1934–35 and 1946–47. It played its home matches in Lahore.

Captained by George Abell, Northern India finished runner-up in the first Ranji Trophy in 1934–35. In the 10 seasons in which it competed in the Ranji Trophy, Northern India played 23 matches, winning 12, losing 9 and drawing 4, and reaching the semi-finals seven times.

After the establishment of Pakistan in 1947, players from Northern India formed the nucleus of the Pakistan cricket team. When Pakistan played its first match, against West Indies in November 1948, nine of the 11 players had played for Northern India in the Ranji Trophy.

Leading players
The highest score was 210 by Abell against Army in 1934–35. The best bowling figures were 8 for 94 by Amir Elahi against Southern Punjab in 1937–38.

References

External links
 First-class matches played by Northern India at CricketArchive

Indian first-class cricket teams
Former senior cricket clubs of India
Cricket in Punjab, India
1890 establishments in British India
1947 disestablishments in British India
Cricket clubs established in 1890